D. E. Bowe was a member of the Wisconsin State Assembly.

Biography
Bowe was born on December 16, 1881 near Waseca, Minnesota. He graduated from Waseca High School in 1901 before attending the University of Minnesota. In 1905, he graduated from the University of Minnesota Law School.

Career
Bowe was elected to the Assembly in 1912. That year, he was also elected as an alderman and President of the Mellen, Wisconsin City Council. Other positions Bowe held include City Attorney of Mellen from 1907 to 1911. He was a Republican.

References

People from Waseca, Minnesota
People from Ashland County, Wisconsin
Republican Party members of the Wisconsin State Assembly
Wisconsin city council members
20th-century American lawyers
20th-century American politicians
University of Minnesota alumni
University of Minnesota Law School alumni
1881 births
Year of death missing
Wisconsin city attorneys